Lehikoinen is a Finnish surname. Notable people with the surname include:

 Pertti Lehikoinen (born 1952), Finnish grandmaster of correspondence chess
 Matti Lehikoinen (born 1984), Finland's leading downhill cyclist
 Esa Lehikoinen (born 1986), Finnish professional ice hockey defenceman
 Kasper Lehikoinen (born 1992), Finnish badminton player

Finnish-language surnames